Vladimir Serov may refer to:

Vladimir Serov (footballer) (born 1979), Russian football player
Vladimir Serov (pilot) (1922–1944), Soviet flying ace